Redhead is a musical with music composed by Albert Hague and lyrics by Dorothy Fields, who with her brother, Herbert, along with Sidney Sheldon and David Shaw wrote the book/libretto. Set in London in the 1880s, around the time of Jack the Ripper, the musical is a murder mystery in the setting of a wax museum.

Productions and background
Herbert and Dorothy Fields wrote the musical, then titled The Works for Beatrice Lillie. When Sidney Sheldon joined the writing team, it was rewritten for Gwen Verdon, who just had two smash hits on Broadway (Damn Yankees and New Girl in Town). Verdon took the lead on the condition that Bob Fosse would be the director as well as choreographer, making this his debut as a director. According to Stanley Green, Verdon was at the time contracted with producers Robert Fryer and Lawrence Carr to appear in a musical written by David Shaw. The producers resolved this conflict by producing Redhead and bringing Shaw in as one of the writers.

Redhead opened on Broadway at the 46th Street Theatre (now the Richard Rodgers Theatre) on February 5, 1959, and closed on March 19, 1960, after 452 performances. Bob Fosse directed and choreographed. Production design was by Rouben Ter-Arutunian and lighting design was by Jean Rosenthal. Orchestrations were by Philip J. Lang and Robert Russell Bennett under the musical direction of Jay Blackton.

The cast starred Verdon and Richard Kiley. The show won the Tony Award for Best Musical. The musical ran in a brief US tour after closing on Broadway, starring Verdon and Kiley. The tour started at the Shubert Theatre, Chicago in March 1960 and ended at the Curran Theatre, San Francisco, California, in June 1960.

One year after the Broadway premiere, a Spanish language adaptation was produced in Mexico City. La pelirroja was starred by the actress Vilma González and the actor Armando Calvo, featuring a young Plácido Domingo. The production opened in the Teatro de los Insurgentes on February 11, 1960.

The Costa Mesa Playhouse in Costa Mesa, California known for mounting lesser-known, unique, and obscure musicals, presented Redhead in June 1981. The musical revival group 42nd Street Moon in San Francisco, presented a staged concert of Redhead from September 2 to 20, 1998.
The Goodspeed Opera House, Connecticut, presented the musical from September to December 1998. Directed by Christopher Ashley, the cast featured Valerie Wright as Essie, Timothy Warmen (Tom), Marilyn Cooper (Aunt Maude), and Carol Morley (Aunt Sarah).

In late January and early February 2015, "Theatre West" in Hollywood, California presented benefit concert performances of Redhead, featuring Lee Meriwether.

Original Broadway cast 
 Essie Whimple – Gwen Verdon
 Tom Baxter –  Richard Kiley
 Ruth LaRue –  Pat Ferrier
 Howard Cavanaugh – William LeMassena
 Maude Simpson – Cynthia Latham
 Sarah Simpson –  Doris Rich
 George Poppett – Leonard Stone
 Inspector White –  Ralph Sumpter
 May – Joy Nichols
 Tilly –  Pat Perrier
 Alfy –  Lee Krieger
 Sir Charles Willingham –  Patrick Horgan

Plot
In Victorian London, the plain Essie Whimple works in the Simpson Sisters Wax Museum, run by her two aunts, Aunt Sarah and Aunt Maude. They show the murder of Ruth LaRue, an American chorus girl, at the museum. They are visited by the murdered women's co-workers and by Inspector White of Scotland Yard. Notable among them is Tom Baxter, a "Strong Man." Essie, attracted to Tom, makes up a story about knowing who the killer is, and fakes an attempt on her life. She hides in Tom's show, and is turned into a "Redhead."

Songs 

Act 1	 		 
 The Simpson Sisters – Singers and Dancers
 The Right Finger of My Left Hand – Essie Whimple
 Just for Once – Essie Whimple, Tom Baxter and George Poppett
 Merely Marvelous – Essie Whimple
 The Uncle Sam Rag – George Poppett, Singers and Dancers
 Erbie Fitch's Twitch – Essie Whimple
 She's Not Enough Woman for Me – Tom Baxter and George Poppett
 Behave Yourself – Essie Whimple, Maude Simpson, Sarah Simpson and Tom Baxter
 Look Who's in Love – Essie Whimple and Tom Baxter
 My Girl Is Just Enough Woman for Me – Tom Baxter and Passersby
 Essie's Vision – Essie Whimple and her Dream People
 Two Faces in the Dark – Essie Whimple, The Tenor, Singers and Dancers

Act II
 I'm Back in Circulation – Tom Baxter
 We Loves Ya, Jimey – Essie Whimple, May, Tilly and Clientele of the Green Dragon
 Pick-Pocket Tango – Essie Whimple and Jailer
 Look Who's in Love (Reprise) – Tom Baxter
 I'll Try – Essie Whimple and Tom Baxter
 Finale – Essie Whimple, Tom Baxter and Company

Awards and nominations

Original Broadway production

References

External links
 
Redhead at the Music Theatre International website
 Guinness Who's Who of Stage Musicals – editor, Colin Larken, 
New York Public Library Blog on Redhead

1959 musicals
Broadway musicals
Original musicals
Musicals by Sidney Sheldon
Musicals choreographed by Bob Fosse
Musicals set in London
Works set in the 1880s
Tony Award for Best Musical
Tony Award-winning musicals